Sultanpur is a medium size village in Phillaur tehsil of Jalandhar District of Punjab State, India. It is located 3 km from census town Apra, 48 km from Jalandhar through Dhuleta-Apra road and 124 km from state capital Chandigarh. Sultanpur has postal head office in Dayalpur which is 2 km away from the village. The village is administrated by a sarpanch who is an elected representative of village as per Panchayati raj (India).

Caste 
The village has schedule caste (SC) constitutes 38.50% of total population of the village and it doesn't have any Schedule Tribe (ST) population.

Education 
The village has a Punjabi Medium, Co-educational primary school (Govt. Primary School Sultanpur). The school provide mid-day meal as per Indian Midday Meal Scheme and the meal prepared in school premises.

Transport

Rail 
Phillaur Junction is the nearest train station which is situated 13 km away, however, Goraya Railway Station is 16.5 km away from the village.

Air 
The nearest domestic airport is located 44 km away in Ludhiana and the nearest international airport is located in Chandigarh also a second nearest international airport is 143 km away in Amritsar.

References 

Villages in Jalandhar district
Villages in Phillaur tehsil